Paul Willard Houser (January 12, 1879 – June 17, 1942) was an American politician in the state of Washington. He served in the Washington House of Representatives and Washington State Senate.

References

1879 births
1942 deaths
Republican Party members of the Washington House of Representatives
Republican Party Washington (state) state senators